Lookout Farm is an album by American jazz saxophonist Dave Liebman recorded in 1973, his first released on the ECM label. When asked about the album, Liebman noted that "the idea was that each of the four tunes had a different kind of vibe, with each representing an interest of mine at the time... The four tunes on Lookout Farm are the same things I’ve been playing throughout my life."

Reception
The Allmusic review by Michael G. Nastos awarded the album 5 stars, stating, "For saxophonist/flutist David Liebman, the collective septet Lookout Farm earmarked him as an emergent band leader and conceptualist, not to mention top-of-the-heap unabashed improviser, especially on the soprano... Lookout Farm'''s sheer democracy in motion, for progressive modern jazz in a fusion era, defined how far artistically a group could go while retaining a distinct identity... This one-of-a-kind band and recording set a high-water mark for far too few bands, even unto itself, to follow. This is worth searching for and savoring".  

Track listingAll compositions by Dave Liebman - Published by Lieb Stone Music''
 "Pablo's Story" - 14:09 
 "Sam's Float" - 8:50 
 "M.D./Lookout Farm" - 23:54

Dave Liebman comments (from album)

Lookout Farm is a new quartet. This is our first album; with the help of friends. The compositions are dedicated to people or experiences I've had. "Pablo's Story" for P. Picasso (with "Andalucia" for Mom); "Sam's Float" is for a water dance; "M.D." for Miles; "Lookout Farm" was where I met Eugene Gregan. - Dave Leibman

Personnel
Dave Liebman - soprano saxophone, tenor saxophone, alto flute
John Abercrombie - guitar
Richard Beirach - piano, electric piano
Frank Tusa - bass, electric bass
Jeff Williams - drums
Armen Halburian - percussion
Don Alias - conga, bongos
Badal Roy - tabla
Steve Sattan - cowbell, tambourine
Eleana Sternberg - vocals

References

 

ECM Records albums
Dave Liebman albums
1974 albums
Albums produced by Manfred Eicher